In late Egyptian mythology, Wepwawet (hieroglyphic wp-w3w.t; also rendered Upuaut, Wep-wawet, Wepawet, and Ophois) was originally a war deity, whose cult centre was Asyut in Upper Egypt (Lycopolis in the Greco-Roman period). His name means opener of the ways and he is often depicted as a wolf standing at the prow of a solar-boat. Some interpret that Wepwawet was seen as a scout, going out to clear routes for the army to proceed forward. One inscription from the Sinai states that Wepwawet "opens the way" to king Sekhemkhet's victory. 

Wepwawet originally was seen as a wolf deity, thus the Greek name of Lycopolis, meaning city of wolves, and it is likely the case that Wepwawet was originally just a symbol of the pharaoh, seeking to associate with wolf-like attributes, that later became deified as a mascot to accompany the pharaoh. Likewise, Wepwawet was said to accompany the pharaoh on hunts, in which capacity he was titled (one with) sharp arrow more powerful than the gods alone.

Over time, the connection to war and thus to death led to Wepwawet also being seen as one who opened the ways to, and through, Duat, for the spirits of the dead. Through this, and the similarity of the jackal to the wolf, Wepwawet became associated with Anubis, a deity that was worshiped in Asyut, eventually being considered his brother. Seen as a jackal, he also was said to be Set's son. Consequently, Wepwawet often is confused with Anubis. This deity appears in the Temple of Seti I at Abydos. 

In later Egyptian art, Wepwawet was depicted as a wolf or a jackal, or as a man with the head of a wolf or a jackal. Even when considered a jackal, Wepwawet usually was shown with grey, or white fur, reflecting his lupine origins. He was depicted dressed as a soldier, as well as carrying other military equipment—a mace and a bow.

For what generally is considered to be lauding purposes of the pharaohs, a later myth briefly was circulated claiming that Wepwawet was born at the sanctuary of Wadjet, the sacred site for the oldest goddess of Lower Egypt that is located in the heart of Lower Egypt. Consequently, Wepwawet, who had hitherto been the standard of Upper Egypt alone, formed an integral part of royal rituals, symbolizing the unification of Egypt.

In later Pyramid Texts, Wepwawet is called "Ra" who has gone up from the horizon, perhaps as the "opener" of the sky. In the later Egyptian funerary context, Wepwawet assists at the Opening of the mouth ceremony and guides the deceased into the netherworld.

In popular culture
In Crusader Kings III, God Wepwawet is the supreme deity of the Kordofan faith.

Wepwawet is the personal god or totem of Thu, the main character in the Lady of the Reeds books by Canadian author Pauline Gedge (House of Dreams, 1994; and House of Illusions, 1996).

Animal origin

The African jackal was the species depicted and the template of numerous Ancient Egyptian deities, including Wepwawet. The Egyptian jackal (previously Canis aureus lupaster, currently Canis lupaster lupaster) also known as the African wolf or wolf jackal was listed as a subspecies of the golden jackal but molecular and osteological data has established that it is a unique species in its own right. It is native to Egypt, Libya, and Ethiopia, though its post-Pleistocene range once encompassed the Palestine region.

Its closest relatives are the Abyssinian wolf, also known as the red wolf and the king jackal, and the Indian wolf. 
The dogs of ancient Egypt were likely domesticated subspecies of one or more of these enigmatic species.

Gallery

See also
 Ancient Egyptian afterlife beliefs
 List of wolves

References

External links
 

Egyptian death gods
Hellenistic Egyptian deities
War gods
Underworld gods
Animal gods
Mythological canines
Hunting gods

ca:Llista de personatges de la mitologia egípcia#W